Garcia Ruiz Cabezas (1600–1658) was a Roman Catholic prelate who served as Bishop of Cartagena (1654–1658).

Biography
Garcia Ruiz Cabezas was born in Majadas, Spain in 1600.
On 27 Jun 1654, he was appointed during the papacy of Pope Innocent X as Bishop of Cartagena.
He served as Bishop of Cartagena until his death in 1658.

References

External links and additional sources
 (for Chronology of Bishops) 
 (for Chronology of Bishops) 

17th-century Roman Catholic bishops in New Granada
Bishops appointed by Pope Innocent X
Roman Catholic bishops of Cartagena in Colombia
1600 births
1658 deaths
People from Cartagena, Colombia